Kavka is a Czech, Slovak and Ukrainian surname. Notable people with the surname include:
Jerome Kavka (1922–2012), U.S. psychologist 
Peter Kavka (born 1990), Slovak footballer

The surname is based on jackdaw bird species that has kavka as its name in Czech and Slovak languages.

See also
Kavka's toxin puzzle
Kafka (surname)
Kafka (disambiguation)